Joseph P. Guth (24 June 1859 – 23 April 1928) was a popular civil engineer, architect and builder in Omaha, Nebraska, starting in the 1880s.

Biography 

Guth was born in Stuttgart, Germany, and attended schools in Württemberg and Bavaria. His father, J. P. Guth, was a notable architect of government railroad projects in Germany in the mid-1800s. Graduating from school in 1879, the younger Guth worked as an architect for two years and decided to immigrate to the United States. Following his father in railroad design, he first worked for the New York, Pennsylvania and Ohio Railroad based in Cleveland, Ohio. Guth soon switched to the Northern Pacific Railroad in Brainerd, Minnesota, and left there to join the Burlington Railroad in Lincoln, Nebraska. He finally landed with the Union Pacific Railroad in Omaha and stayed there until 1887.

He immigrated to the United States in 1884. Originally living in Cleveland, Ohio, Guth partnered with Joseph Dietrick to start an architectural firm; however, by 1891 the partnership had dissolved. Continuing as a sole proprietor, Guth worked business blocks, breweries, factories and warehouses, fire stations, schools, single and multifamily residences, churches and halls in Omaha and across eastern Nebraska. Guth is also credited with designing several industrial brewing buildings for the Storz and Krug breweries in Omaha.

Omaha's prolific apartment designer Henry D. Frankfurt apprenticed under Guth.

Guth practiced architecture until he died, aged 68, in Omaha at his 1911 Wirt Street home on 23 April 1928. He was buried at Forest Lawn Memorial Park in Omaha.

Notable designs 

 Prague Hotel (1898) NRHP Omaha
 Eggerss-O'Flyng Building (1902) NRHP Omaha
 St. John's German Evangelical Lutheran Church, (1902) Lyons
 Fepco Building (1903)
 Omaha Casket Company (1905)
 Apartments (1906) 536 S 26th Avenue, Omaha
 Apartments (1906) 554 S 26th Avenue, Omaha
 Schuyler City Hall (1908) NRHP 1020 A Street, Schuyler
 Trimble House (1909)
 Omaha Fire Department Hose Company No. 4 (1913) 999 North 16th Street, Omaha
 St. Luke's Episcopal Church (1913) 2304 2nd Avenue, Kearney
 Druid Hall (1915) 2412 Ames Avenue, Omaha
 Shirby Apartments (1922) 3320 California Street, Omaha
 Single family dwelling (1922) 5116 Nicholas Street, Omaha (Part of the Dundee-Happy Hollow Historic District)
 Single family dwelling (1923) 308 South 52nd Street, Omaha (Part of the Dundee-Happy Hollow Historic District)
 Boulevard Apartments (1923) 606 S 32nd Avenue, Omaha
 Seymour Apartments (1923) 608 S 32nd Avenue, Omaha
 Harriet Court Apartments (1925) 137 N 33rd Street, Omaha
 Augustus B. Slater Residence (1925) local landmark, 1050 South 32nd Street, Omaha

See also
 Thomas Rogers Kimball
 John Latenser, Sr.
 Architecture in Omaha, Nebraska
 Omaha Landmarks

References

External links
1911 Wirt Street, Omaha, Guth's former home – Google Street View

1859 births
1928 deaths
Architects from Stuttgart
Artists from Omaha, Nebraska
Architects from Nebraska
Württemberger emigrants to the United States
19th-century American architects
20th-century American architects
American civil engineers
Engineers from Nebraska